Buccinaria martini is a species of sea snail, a marine gastropod mollusk in the family Raphitomidae.

Description
The length of the shell attains 38.8 mm.

Distribution
This marine species occurs off the Philippines and Japan.

References

 Koperberg, Ella Julie. Jungtertiäre und quartäre Mollusken von Timor. No. 17. Algemeene Landsdrukkerij, 1931.
 Bouchet P. & Sysoev A. (1997) Revision of the Recent species of Buccinaria (Gastropoda: Conoidea), a genus of deep-water turrids of Tethyan origin. Venus, Japanese Journal of Malacology, 56:93-119

External links
 

martini
Gastropods described in 1931